Mansbridge is a suburb of Southampton, England.

Mansbridge may also refer to:

 Albert Mansbridge (1876–1952), British educator
 Jane Mansbridge (born 1939), Harvard professor
 John Mansbridge (artist) (1901–1981), British artist
 John B. Mansbridge (1917–2016), American art director
 Peter Mansbridge (born 1948), Canadian journalist and anchor of The National
 Ronald Mansbridge (1905–2006), publisher, author and wit